The Javan hidden shrew or Javan long-tailed shrew (Crocidura abscondita, also erroneously referred to as Crocidura absconditus) is a species of mammal in the family Soricidae. It is endemic to the island of Java in Indonesia.

Taxonomy 
It was described in 2014 based on its morphological distinctiveness, with phylogenetic analysis also supporting it as being a distinct species. Phylogenetic analysis indicates that it is a sister species to the Sumatran long-tailed shrew (C. paradoxura), from which it diverged during the Miocene, about 9.5 million years ago.

The specific name, abscondita, means 'hidden' in Latin and is a reference to the undescribed ("hidden") mammal species of Southeast Asia.

Distribution and habitat 
It is endemic to the Mount Gede-Pangrango area, a double-peak stratovolcano located in West Java, Indonesia. It is thought to inhabit montane and subalpine forests.

Description 
It is a species of Crocidura of medium size, with a total length of ± 161.8 mm, a tail of ± 88.3 mm and a weight of ± 7.5 mm. Its pelage is gray at the base of hairs, with brown tips on the back and gray tips on the belly.

Status 
It may be threatened by habitat loss, which has been extensive throughout Java, but little is known of this species' life history or habitat preference. It is thus classified as Data Deficient on the IUCN Red List.

References 

Crocidura
Endemic fauna of Java
Mammals of Indonesia
Mammals described in 2014